O Maior Brasileiro de Todos os Tempos was a public poll contest organized by the Brazilian broadcasting station SBT and hosted by Carlos Nascimento to rank the most outstanding Brazilian personalities. Based on BBC's 100 Greatest Britons, it featured individual documentaries advocating the top ten candidates.

After three months of voting and more than a million votes recorded, one hundred persons were selected, appointed by the thousands of Brazilians.

The final episode aired on October 3, 2012. Chico Xavier was elected the greatest Brazilian of all time.

List

Top 12 
The top 12 candidates are the following. (The Top 12 were announced in alphabetic order. they are the final candidates. There will be an eliminatory round by journalists and advocates, where the greatest Brazilian will be chosen):

Eliminatories

Final

Other editions

Other countries have produced similar shows; see Greatest Britons spin-offs

References

2012 Brazilian television series debuts
2012 Brazilian television series endings
Brazil
Lists of Brazilian people
Sistema Brasileiro de Televisão original programming
Brazilian television series based on British television series